Batons or Clubs is one of the four suits of playing cards in the standard Latin deck along with the suits of Cups, Coins and Swords. 'Batons' is the name usually given to the suit in Italian-suited cards where the symbols look like batons. 'Clubs' refers to the suit in Spanish-suited cards where the symbols look more like wooden clubs.

Before 1800, French cardmakers, who also made Spanish card games, called them cartes à bâtons. Symbol on Italian pattern cards:    Symbol on Spanish pattern cards:  Symbol on French Aluette (Spanish-)pattern cards:

Characteristics 
In Spanish, the Batons are called bastos; and in Italian, bastoni. In cartomancy and occultist circles, the suit of Batons is usually called Wands.

See also 
 Spanish playing cards
 Italian playing cards
 Suit of Wands - suit used in divinatory tarot cards

Notes and references 

Card suits